John Crosby III (November 1, 1828 – December 29, 1887) was an American businessman. Crosby was a founding partner of the Washburn-Crosby Company, the forerunner to General Mills.

Career
Born in Hampden to John II and Anne K. Stetson, Crosby became heavily involved in the family paper mill business, as well as an iron foundry and machine shop in nearby Bangor. He then moved to Minneapolis in 1877 and became involved in the milling industry there. Crosby purchased an interest in the Washburn "B" Mill, a predecessor to the Washburn "A" Mill, and developed a business partnership with Cadwallader C. Washburn, inventor of the middlings purifier, as well as a silent partnership with William Hood Dunwoody. In that year, they formed the Washburn-Crosby Company to produce winter wheat, and Crosby oversaw its expansion.

Legacy
Crosby remained a partner of the Washburn-Crosby Company until his death in 1887. He was buried at Lakewood Cemetery. One of Crosby's sons, Franklin, took over the role for the business. The company became the forerunner to General Mills.

In 1924, Washburn-Crosby purchased the WLAG radio station and renamed it to WCCO, in honor of Crosby and his company. The station was used by Betty Crocker.

Personal life
In 1886, Crosby married Olive Loring Muzzy, daughter of Franklin Muzzy, a noted politician. The couple had three children: Caroline, Franklin, and John IV. The marriage lasted until the death of Muzzy in 1876, and Crosby married his second wife, Emma Gilson, three years later.

Through his son, Franklin, Crosby is the great-grandfather of Sumner McKnight Crosby, a noted art historian.

References

External links
Find a Grave profile

1828 births
1887 deaths
People from Hampden, Maine
19th-century American businesspeople